Nehemias Ó Brácáin OCist  was a bishop in Ireland during the 13th-century.

The Prior of Mellifont,  he was elected by the Chapter  in 1227. He was succeeded upon his death in 1240 by his brother David Ó Brácáin,

References

13th-century Roman Catholic bishops in Ireland
Pre-Reformation bishops of Clogher
1267 deaths
Irish Cistercians